Henry Noel may refer to:

Henry Noel (courtier) (died 1597), Elizabethan courtier and Member of Parliament
Henry Noel (MP) (1642–1677), Member of Parliament for Stamford
Henry Noel, 6th Earl of Gainsborough (1743–1798), English peer
Henry Martyn Noel (fl. 1940s), American peace activist in Allied-occupied Germany